Madin is a surname. Notable people with the name include:
Billy Madin, English footballer
Henry Madin (1698–1748), French composer
John Madin (1924–2012), English architect
Jon Madin (born 1949), music teacher in Australia
Laurence Madin, American marine biologist

See also
Maddin, surname